Bruce Lee Cunningham (September 29, 1905 in San Francisco – March 8, 1984 in Hayward, California), was a Major League Baseball pitcher from - for the Boston Braves.

External links

1905 births
1984 deaths
Major League Baseball pitchers
Baseball players from California
Boston Braves players